Tsvetomir Panov (born 17 April 1989) is a Bulgarian professional footballer currently playing for Cherno More Varna as a defender.

Career

Panov came to Litex Lovech from Spartak Pleven in January 2009. For three seasons with Spartak he earned 49 appearances playing in the Second League. He made his team debut for Litex on 3 February 2009, in a 5-1 friendly drubbing of Chinese vice-champion Shanghai Shenhua.

Panov played for Slavia Sofia between 2013 and 2016. He was part of the squad that finished on 4th place during season 2015–16.

Botev Plovdiv
On 9 June 2016, Panov signed a one-year contract with Botev Plovdiv. On 30 July 2016, he made his debut in a 1-1 draw against the local rivals Lokomotiv Plovdiv.

On 9 December 2017, Panov scored his first goal for Botev for the 3-0 win over Etar Veliko Tarnovo. His outstanding performance earned him the award for man of the match.

On 20 February 2018 Panov was sold to Ludogorets.

International career
Between 2006 and 2008 Panov was part of the Bulgaria national under-19 football team. With the team he played at the 2008 UEFA European Under-19 Football Championship in the Czech Republic.

On 21 August 2017, Panov and his teammate from Botev Plovdiv Todor Nedelev were called for the games of the Bulgaria national football team. Panov remained an unused substitute during the historical 3-2 win over Sweden. Several weeks later, at the beginning of October 2017, he was again included in the Bulgaria national football team. He finally made a debut in the national team on 26 March 2018 in a 2–1 win against Kazakhstan.

Honours
Botev Plovdiv
 Bulgarian Cup: 2016–17
 Bulgarian Supercup: 2017

Ludogorets
 Bulgarian First League: 2017–18
 Bulgarian Supercup: 2018

References

External links
 

1989 births
Living people
Bulgarian footballers
Bulgaria international footballers
Bulgaria youth international footballers
PFC Spartak Pleven players
PFC Litex Lovech players
PFC Vidima-Rakovski Sevlievo players
FC Lyubimets players
PFC Slavia Sofia players
Botev Plovdiv players
PFC Ludogorets Razgrad players
PFC Ludogorets Razgrad II players
PFC Cherno More Varna players
First Professional Football League (Bulgaria) players
Association football defenders
Sportspeople from Pleven